Tacuarembó ( Guarani: Takuarembo, literally: "Bamboo shoot") is the capital city of the Tacuarembó Department in north-central Uruguay.

History
On 24 October 1831, a presidential decree by Fructuoso Rivera ordered the creation of a city in the region. The task was entrusted to the President's brother, Colonel Bernabé Rivera.

Colonel Rivera left Montevideo on a three-month journey with a caravan of wagons and families, towards the shore of the Tacuaremboty River, which in the Guaraní language means "river of the reeds". The area was surveyed and divided into blocks for settlement. On January 21, 1832, Coronel Rivera founded the town under the name "San Fructuoso", after Saint Fructuosus of Tarragona (whose Saint's Day is January 21) and after his (Benjamin's) brother.

By 1837, San Fructuoso was a growing town. It had more than 500 residents, a justice of the peace, a military commander, a parish priest, a mayor, and a Public Works Commission. On 16 June 1837, the Tacuarembó Department was created (along with Salto and Paysandú), and San Fructuoso was named the capital.

Over time, the community continued to grow. According to the Act of Ley Nº 2.389, on 17 July 1895 it held the status of "Villa" (town). Its name changed to "Tacuarembó", and on 24 June 1912, its status was elevated to "Ciudad" (city) by the Act of Ley Nº 4.031.

Population
In 2011, Tacuarembó had a population of 54,755.
 
Source: Instituto Nacional de Estadística de Uruguay

Geography
Routes 26 and 31 also meet Route 5 within the city limits. The stream Arroyo Tacuarembó Chico, a tributary of Río Tacuarembó, flows through the north part of the city. As of the census of 2011, it is the eighth most populated city of the country.

Climate
Tacuarembó has a humid subtropical climate, described by the Köppen climate classification as Cfa. Summers are warm to hot and winters are cool, with frequent frosts and fog. The precipitation is evenly distributed throughout the year, with an average of 1,165 mm (45.87 in), and the annual average temperature is 18 °C (64.4 °F).

Places of worship
 St. Fructuosus Cathedral (Roman Catholic)
 Holy Cross Parish Church (Roman Catholic)
 St. Joseph Parish Church (Roman Catholic)
 Our Lady of Lourdes Parish Church (Roman Catholic)

Notable people
Writers Circe Maia, Mario Benedetti, Tomás de Mattos, and  Jorge Majfud are from Tacuarembó, as is José Núñez, 19th century Nicaraguan politician. Some Uruguayans claim that the tango musician Carlos Gardel was born near Tacuarembó, in the village of Valle Edén. Scholarly consensus is that he was born in Toulouse, France, then raised in Buenos Aires, but as an adult he obtained legal papers saying he was born in Tacuarembó, probably to avoid French military authorities.

See also
Cerro Batoví

References

External links

DelTacua.com.uy Community
Article on the Laguna de Lavaderas of the city's park, Official Portal of Uruguayan Government
"Fundamentos Culturales de Tacuarembó" Washington Benavides, Ciudadano Ilustre de Tacuarembó.
INE map of Tacuarembó and La Pedrera

Populated places in the Tacuarembó Department
Populated places established in 1832